The women's 3 metre synchronized springboard competition of the diving events at the 2011 Pan American Games was held on October 29  at the Scotiabank Aquatics Center. The defending Pan American Games champion were Paola Espinosa and Laura Sánchez of Mexico.

Schedule
All times are Central Daylight Time (UTC-5).

Results
The final round was held on October 27.

References 

Diving at the 2011 Pan American Games